Gunnlaugsdóttir is an Icelandic patronymic. It may refer to:

 Álfrún Gunnlaugsdóttir (born 1938), Icelandic writer
 Áslaug Munda Gunnlaugsdóttir (born 2001), Icelandic footballer
 Ásta B. Gunnlaugsdóttir (born 1961), Icelandic footballer
 Jóhanna Gunnlaugsdóttir, Icelandic professor
 Pálína Gunnlaugsdóttir (born 1987), Icelandic basketball player
 Tinna Gunnlaugsdóttir (born 1954), Icelandic actress